The Porbandar–Jetalsar section is a  length of railroad track that connects Porbandar  to Jetalsar. It belongs to the Western Railway of Bhavnagar Division in Gujarat, India.

History 

Porbandar–Jamjodhpur was opened by the Porbandar Railway in 1888, while Jetalsar–Rajkot was opened in 1890 by Jetalsar-Rajkot Railway completing the full section with the support of other Princely state railways. Gauge conversion was completed in 2011.

References 

5 ft 6 in gauge railways in India
Railway lines in Gujarat
Porbandar district

Western Railway zone